Thiha Zaw (born 28 December 1993) is a Burmese footballer who plays as an attacking midfielder for Koh Kong  in the Cambodian League 2 and the Myanmar national football team. He has played at club level in the 2013 AFC Cup, 2014 AFC Cup, and 2014 AFC Cup.

International goals

References

1993 births
Living people
Burmese footballers
Myanmar international footballers
Ayeyawady United F.C. players
Association football fullbacks
Southeast Asian Games silver medalists for Myanmar
Southeast Asian Games medalists in football
Competitors at the 2015 Southeast Asian Games
Expatriate footballers in Cambodia